Hanako Jimi is a Japanese politician who is a member of the House of Councillors of Japan.

Biography 
She was elected in 2016, and re-elected in 2022.

References 

Living people
1976 births
Members of the House of Councillors (Japan)